This is a list of compositions by György Kurtág.

Compositions by opus number 

Notes:

Works without opus number:
 Viola Concerto (1954)
 Játékok ("Games") (since 1973, 10 Volumes as of 2021), for piano
 In Memoriam György Zilcz (1975), for 2 trumpets, 2 trombones and tuba
 13 Pieces for Cimbalom (1982), for 2 cimbaloms
 Games and Messages for winds (since 1984)
 Transcriptions from Machaut to J.S. Bach (1985), for 4-hand and 6-hand piano and 2 pianos
 Pilinszky János: Gérard de Nerval (1986), for violoncello
 3 In Memoriam (1988–90), for 1-hand, 2-hand and 3-hand piano
 Signs, Games and Messages for solo violin, viola, cello, double bass, flute, oboe, clarinet (since 1989)
 Ligatura E Versetti (1990), for organ
 Aus Der Ferne III (1991), for Alfred Schlee's 90th birthday, for string quartet
 Looking Back: Old and New for Four Players, Hommage à Stockhausen (1993), for trumpet, double-bass and keyboard instruments
 Epilog for Requiem of Reconciliation (1995)
 Miriam Marbé in Memoriam (1999), for three recorders
 Six Pieces for Trombone and Piano (1999)
 Petite musique solennelle – En hommage à Pierre Boulez 90 (2015) for orchestra
 Samuel Beckett: Fin de partie. Scènes et monologues, opéra en un acte (2018), opera

Compositions by genre

Solo Instrumental 
Piano
 Suite for four-hand piano (1950–1951)
 Elö-játékok (1973–1974)
 Játékok (Games) for piano, four-hand piano, and two pianos (10 Volumes published, 1973–    )
 Szálkák (1973–1978)
 3 in memoriam (1988–1990)
 Viola da Gamba
…sospiri, gemiti…  (2011)

Violin
 Hipartita for solo violin (2000–2004)
 29 Jelek, játékok és üzenetek (Signs, Games and Messages) for solo violin (1989–2004)
Viola
 29 Jelek, játékok és üzenetek (Signs, Games and Messages) for solo viola (1998–2005)
Cello
 19 Jelek, játékok és üzenetek (Signs, Games and Messages) for solo cello (1987–2008)
Double Bass
 4 Jelek, játékok és üzenetek (Signs, Games and Messages) for solo double bass (1999–2000)
Flute
 6 Jelek, játékok és üzenetek (Signs, Games and Messages) for solo flute (1992–2005)
Oboe
 6 Jelek, játékok és üzenetek (Signs, Games and Messages) for solo oboe (1997–2001)
Clarinet
 6 Jelek, játékok és üzenetek (Signs, Games and Messages) for solo clarinet (1984–2001)
Bassoon
 3 Jelek, játékok és üzenetek (Signs, Games and Messages) for solo bassoon (1986–2001)
Guitar
 Cinque Merrycate for solo guitar (1962) (Revoked)
Organ
 Ligature e versetti for organ (1990)
Cymbalom
Szálkák for cimbalom (1973)

Chamber
Duets
 8 duets for violin and cimbalom (1960)
 Tre pezzi for violin and pianoforte (1979)
 13 Darab két cimbalomra a Játékokból for two cimbalom (1982)
 Panaszos kérlelö for recorder and piano (1988)
 Tre pezzi for clarinet and cimbalom (1996)
 Tre altri pezzifor clarinet and cimbalom (1996)
 Játékok és üzenetek (Games and Messages) for woodwind duo (1998–2000)
 Jelek, játékok és üzenetek (Signs, Games and Messages) for string duo (1978–2003)
 Négy initium az Hommage à Jacob Obrecht-ből for viola and cello (2005)
 Triptic for two violins (2007)
Trios
 A kis csáva for piccolo, trombone, and guitar (1978)
 Bagatelles for flute, piano and double bass, arrangements from Játékok (1981)
 Hommage à R. Sch. for clarinet (and bass drum), viola, and piano (1990)
 Myriam Marbé in memoriam for three recorders (1999)
 Jelek, játékok és üzenetek (Signs, Games and Messages) for string trio (1989–2005)
String Quartet
 String quartet (1959)
 Hommage à András Mihály 12 microludes for string quartet (1977–1978)
 Officium breve in memoriam Andreæ Szervánszky for string quartet (1988–1989)
 Aus der ferne III for string quartet (1991)
 Aus der Ferne V for string quartet (1999)
 Hommage à Jacob Obrecht for string quartet (2004–2005)
  6 Moments Musicaux for string quartet (1999–2005)
 Zwiegespräch for string quartet and electronics (co-written with György Kurtág Jr.) (1999–2006)
Other Quartets
Ligatura-Message to Frances-Marie The Answered Unanswered Question, for BACH-bow cello, two violins, and celesta (1989)
 Életút (Lebenslauf) for two pianos (tuned a quarter tone apart) and two basset horns (1992)
 Rückblick De l'ancien et du nouveau pour quatre instrumentistes (trumpet, double bass and keyboards) – Hommage à Stockhausen (1993)
Quintets
 Wind quintet (1959)
 In memoriam György Zilcz for two trumpets, two trombones, and tuba (1975)
Other
Irka-firka születésnapra – Mihály Andrásnak for two violons, two violas, cello, and double bass (1991)
 Játékok és üzenetek (Games and Messages) for winds, strings, and keyboard (1992–2000)

Ensemble/orchestral
 24 Antiphonae (1970–1971, incomplete)
 ΣΤΗΛΗ (Stele) for orchestra (1994)
 ...a Százévesnek – Hommage à Takács Jenő for small string orchestra (2002)
 Sinfonia breve per archi – Fried Márta emlékére for small string orchestra (2004)
 Új üzenetek zenekarra for orchestra (1998–2008)
 Brefs messages (2010)
 Petite musique solennelle – En hommage à Pierre Boulez 90 for orchestra (2015)

Concertante
 Mouvement for viola and orchestra (1953–1954)
 Confessio concerto for piano (1980–1986)
 …quasi una fantasia… for piano and spatialized instrumental groups (1987–1988)
 Grabstein für Stephan for guitar and spatialized instrumental groups (1978–1989)
 Double concerto for piano, cello, and two spatialized instrumental groups (1989–1990)
 ...concertante... pour violin, viola, and orchestra (2003)

Vocal
 Tánc dal for children choir and piano on a text by Sandor Weöres (1950)
 Bornemisza Péter mondásai for soprano and piano on texts written by Péter Bornemisza (1963–1968)
 Egy téli alkony emlékére (4 fragments on poems by Pál Gulyás), for soprano, violin, and cimbalom (1969)
 Négy capriccio for soprano and chamber orchestra, on texts by István Bálint (1959–1970)
 Négy dal Pilinszky János verseire for bassand chamber orchestra (1975)
 Eszká-emlékzaj (7 Songs on poems by Dezső Tandori, for soprano and violin (1974–1975)
 Herdecker Eurythmie "…sur des poèmes de Ellen Lösch", for speaker and tenor vielle (1979)
 Poslanija pokojnoj R. V. Trusovoj 21 poems of Rimma Dalos, for soprano and ensemble (1976–1980)
 Hét dal for soprano and cimbalom (or piano) (1981)
 Stsenï iz romana 15 poems of Rimma Dalos for soprano, violin, double bass, and cimbalom (1979–1982)
 Három dal Pilinszky János verseire for bass and piano (1975–1986)
 Requiem po drugu for soprano and piano (1982–1987)
 Kafka-Fragmente for soprano and violin (1985–1987)
 Három régi felirat for soprano and piano (1986–1987)
 Hölderlin : An... for tenor and piano (1988–1989)
 Samuel Beckett: What is the Word Siklós István tolmácsolásában Beckett Sámuel üzeni Monyók Ildikóval for solo alto (speaker), five voices, and spatialized instrumental groups (1990–1991)
 Samuel Beckett: mi is a szó Siklós István tolmácsolásában Beckett Sámuel üzeni Monyók Ildikóval for voice and upright piano (1990)
 Pesni Unïniya i Pechali op. 18 for double mixed choir and instruments (1980–1994)
 Requiem der Versöhnung for soloists, choir and orchestra (1995)
 Üzenetek zenekarra for orchestra and mixed choir (1991–1996)
 Hölderlin-Gesänge for solo barytone (and instruments) (1993–1997) 
 …pas à pas – nulle part… for barytone, percussion and string trio (1993–1998)
 Einige Sätze aus den Sudelbüchern Georg Christoph Lichtenbergs revised version for soprano and double bass (1996–1999) 
 Esterházy Péter: Fancsikó és Pinta (Töredékek) – Bevezetés a Szépéneklés Müvészetébe I for solo voice, piano, and celesta (1999)
 Colindă – Baladă for tenor, two mixed choirs and instrumental ensemble (2000–2007)
 Songs to Poems by Anna Akhmatova for soprano and ensemble (1997–2008)
...elszunnyadni, - semmi több... (Három dal Tandori Dezső verseire) (...to sleep, - no more..., (Songs to poems by Dezső Tandori)) for solo alto, [violin, piano & percussion / cello] (2019)

A cappella 
  Klárisok for mixed choir on a poem by Attila József (1950)
 Omaggio a Luigi Nono op. 16 for choir (1979)
 Kórkép és Hattyudal for mixed choir (1978–1981)
 József Attila-töredékek for solo soprano (1981)
 Nyolc kórus Tandori Dezső verseir for mixed choir (1981–1984)

Opera 
 Samuel Beckett: Fin de partie. Scènes et monologues, opéra en un acte (2018)

References

External links
 György Kurtág works (59) on the Editio Musica Budapest website (publisher)

Lists of compositions by composer